Albert Tsai (born August 5, 2004) is an American actor. He is best known for starring as  Fred on the Disney Channel comedy series Coop & Cami Ask the World and as Bert Harrison on ABC’s Trophy Wife from 2013 to 2014.  Tsai has also made recurring guest appearances as Phillip Goldstein in the ABC comedy series Fresh Off the Boat. In 2014, at the age of nine, he earned a Best Supporting Actor nomination from the Critics' Choice Television Awards for his performance on ABC’s comedy series Trophy Wife. In 2015, Tsai was named one of Entertainment Weeklys 12 Best Child Actors of 2015 for his work on Dr. Ken. In 2019, Tsai starred as Peng in the DreamWorks Animation and Pearl Studio animated feature film Abominable, released by Universal Pictures on September 27, 2019.

Career
Tsai was born and raised in San Jose, California. He is bilingual and speaks Mandarin fluently. Tsai discovered his interest in acting at seven years old, while he participated in a school play. In 2013, he had his first television appearance on the CBS series How I Met Your Mother. Later that year, Tsai was cast as Bert Harrison, the adopted Chinese son of an attorney and his ex-wife, in the critically acclaimed comedy series Trophy Wife.   His acting on the show earned him a nomination for Best Supporting Actor from the Critics' Choice Television Awards and he was named as a Breakout TV Star of 2013 by The Huffington Post. Tsai was a regular cast-member on the show until its cancellation in 2014.
 
In 2014, Tsai guest starred in the USA Network's comedy Benched, and as a boy scout who helps Betty White in the TV Land series Hot in Cleveland. He also made his standup comedy debut on The Arsenio Hall Show. In 2015, Tsai appeared in two episodes of the ABC series Fresh Off the Boat and starred in the film Grandma Money as Pope, a neglected and shy 9 year old. Later that year Tsai was  cast as Dave Park, the son of main character Ken Park (Ken Jeong), in the ABC comedy Dr. Ken. Shortly after the series premiered, Tsai was named one of Entertainment Weeklys 12 Best Child Actors of 2015. In 2016, Tsai guest starred in The CW comedy Crazy Ex-Girlfriend, voiced a character on The Mr. Peabody & Sherman Show, and won the Best Young Actor in a Television series at the first Young Entertainer Awards. In 2017, Tsai guest starred in the 9JKL pilot and was promoted to series regular for the first season of CBS family comedy.

In 2018, Tsai was cast as Fred on Disney Channels new live-action comedy Coop and Cami Ask the World which premiered on October 12, 2018. In 2019, Tsai starred as Peng in DreamWorks’ animated feature film Abominable, released on September 27 by Universal Pictures.

Filmography

Television

Film

Awards and nominations

References

External links 

 
 

2004 births
American male child actors
American male television actors
American male actors of Taiwanese descent
Living people
Male actors from San Jose, California
21st-century American male actors